Mirko Bullo (born 26 September 1959) is a retired Swiss football defender.

References

1959 births
Living people
Swiss men's footballers
AC Bellinzona players
FC Lugano players
Swiss Super League players
Association football defenders